The Jeju uprising, known in South Korea as the Jeju April 3 incident, was an uprising on Jeju Island from April 1948 to May 1949. A year prior to its start, residents of Jeju had begun protesting elections scheduled by the United Nations Temporary Commission on Korea (UNTCOK) to be held in the United States-occupied half of Korea, which they believed would entrench the division of the country. A general strike was later organised by the Workers' Party of South Korea (WPSK) from February to March 1948. The WPSK launched an insurgency in April 1948, attacking police and Northwest Youth League members stationed on Jeju who had been mobilized to suppress the protests by force. The First Republic of Korea under President Syngman Rhee escalated the suppression of the uprising from August 1948, declaring martial law in November and beginning an "eradication campaign" against rebel forces in the rural areas of Jeju in March 1949, defeating them within two months. Many rebel veterans and suspected sympathizers were later killed upon the outbreak of the Korean War in June 1950, and the existence of the Jeju uprising was officially censored and repressed in South Korea for several decades.

The Jeju uprising was notable for its extreme violence; between 14,000 and 30,000 people (10 percent of Jeju's population) were killed, and 40,000 fled to Japan. Atrocities and war crimes were committed by both sides, but historians have noted that the methods used by the South Korean government to suppress protesters and rebels were especially cruel, with violence against civilians by pro-government forces contributing to the Yeosu-Suncheon rebellion in South Jeolla during the conflict. Some historians and scholars, including military historian Allan R. Millett, regard the Jeju uprising as the true beginning of the Korean War.

In 2006, almost 60 years after the Jeju uprising, the South Korean government apologized for its role in the killings and promised reparations. In 2019, the South Korean police and defense ministry apologized for the first time over the massacres.

Background

Political situation in Korea
After Imperial Japan surrendered to Allied forces on August 15, 1945, the 35-year Japanese occupation of Korea finally came to an end. Korea was subsequently divided at the 38th parallel north, with the Soviet Union assuming trusteeship north of the line and the United States south of the line. In September 1945, Lt. General John R. Hodge established a military government to administer the southern region, which included Jeju Island. In December 1945, U.S. representatives met with those from the Soviet Union and United Kingdom to work out joint trusteeship. Due to lack of consensus, however, the U.S. took the "Korean question" to the United Nations for further deliberation. On November 14, 1947, the United Nations General Assembly passed UN Resolution 112, calling for a general election on May 10, 1948, under UNTCOK supervision.

Fearing it would lose influence over the northern half of Korea if it complied, the Soviet Union rejected the UN resolution and denied the UNTCOK access to northern Korea. UNTCOK nevertheless went through with the elections, albeit in the southern half of the country only. The Soviet Union responded to these elections in the south with an election of its own in the north on August 25, 1948.

Political situation on Jeju Island
Residents of Jeju island were some of the most active participants in the Korean independence movement against colonial Japanese occupation. Due to the island's relative isolation from the mainland peninsula, Jeju experienced relative peace after the Japanese surrender, contrasting with the period of heavy unrest in the southern region of mainland Korea. As with the mainland, the period immediately following the Japanese surrender was characterized by the formation of People's Committees, local autonomous councils tasked with coordinating the transition towards Korean independence. When the American military government arrived on Jeju in late 1945, the Jeju People's Council was the only existing government on the island. As a testament to this relative stability, the US military governor under the United States Army Military Government in Korea (USAMGIK) John R. Hodge stated in October 1947 that Jeju was "a truly communal area that is peacefully controlled by the People's Committee without much Comintern influence."

The Jeju People's Committee had come under the directive of the Workers' Party of South Korea (WPSK) by late 1946. The WPSK encouraged the People's Council to establish military and political committees, as well as mass organizations. The 1946 USAMGIK dissolution of the provisional People's Republic of Korea and their associated People's Committees on the mainland sparked the Autumn Uprising of 1946, which did not spread to Jeju (as its PC still operated virtually undisturbed by the American military government) but did contribute to rising tensions on the island.

Incidents leading up to the uprising

Sam-Il demonstrations 
Residents of Jeju began protesting against the elections a year before they took place. Particularly concerned about permanently dividing the peninsula, the WPSK planned gatherings on March 1, 1947, to denounce the elections and simultaneously celebrate the anniversary of the March 1st Movement (also known as the Sam-Il Movement). An attempt by the security forces to disperse the crowds only brought more citizens of Jeju out in support of the demonstrations. The police fired indiscriminate warning shots, some of which went into the crowd. Although these shots successfully pacified the demonstrators, six civilians were killed, including a six-year-old child.

Chong-myon jail incident 
On March 8, 1947, a crowd of about a thousand demonstrators gathered at the Chong-myon jail, demanding the release of WPSK members the military government had arrested during the Sam-Il demonstrations. When the demonstrators started throwing rocks and subsequently rushed the jail, the police inside shot at them in a panic, killing five. In response, WPSK members and others called on the military government to take action against the police officers who fired on the crowd. Instead, 400 more police officers were flown in from the mainland, along with members of an extreme right-wing paramilitary group known as the Northwest Youth League. Although both the police and paramilitary groups employed violent and harsh tactics in their suppression of the locals, the Northwest Youth League was especially ruthless, described as borderline terroristic.

February 1948 general strike 
As the May 10, 1948 elections approached, WPSK leaders hardened in their opposition to the involvement of UNTCOK in Korean affairs, as they believed the elections would concretise the 38th parallel partition as a border, rendering a unified, independent Korea much less likely. In January 1948, Pak Hon-yong, the leader of the WPSK, called on WPSK members south of the 38th parallel to oppose the elections by whatever means necessary, and called for a general strike to begin on February 7. At this point, there were at least 60,000 members of the WPSK on Jeju, and at least 80,000 active supporters. These members and supporters not only went on strike but in some cases attacked government installations and engaged with police forces in open conflict. These engagements between WPSK guerrillas against rightist groups and police continued through March 1948.

Rebellion

April 3, 1948 

Although skirmishes had been taking place on Jeju Island since early 1947, April 3, 1948, is considered as the day the Jeju uprising officially began.  Some sources claim it came about when military police "fired on a demonstration commemorating the Korean struggle against Japanese rule," igniting mass insurrection. Other sources, however, make no mention of this demonstration incident, and claim that WPSK plans to attack on April 3 had been in the works for some time. Whatever the case, around 02:00 around 500 WPSK guerrillas alongside up to 3,000 sympathizers attacked Northwest Youth League positions as well as 11 of the 24 police stations on the island, killing 30 police officers, specifically targeting those who were known to have previously collaborated with the Japanese.

Lieutenant General Kim Ik-ryeol, commander of police forces on the island, attempted to end the insurrection peacefully by negotiating with the rebels. He met several times with rebel leader Kim Dal-sam of the WPSK but neither side could agree on conditions. The government wanted a complete surrender and the rebels demanded disarmament of the local police, dismissal of all governing officials on the island, prohibition of paramilitary groups, and the re-unification and liberation of the Korean peninsula.

In the wake of these failed peace negotiations, the fighting continued. The U.S. military government responded to guerrilla activity by transferring another regiment to Jeju from Busan and deploying police companies, each 1,700 strong, from the southern provinces of the mainland. The guerrillas retreated to their bases in the forests and caves around Hallasan, an extinct volcano and the highest mountain in South Korea. On April 29, the Korean, non-military, governor of Jeju province abandoned his post, defected, and joined the guerrillas. This caused many police officers, disillusioned by the atrocities they were ordered to commit against their own, to do the same. In response, U.S. military provincial governor William F. Dean ordered a purge of WPSK sympathizers from the ranks of the Korean Constabulary, and three sergeants were summarily executed.

Fighting continued through the May 10 elections. A total of 214 people had been killed by then. During election week, the guerrillas "cut telephone lines, destroyed bridges, and blocked roads with piles of stones to disrupt communications." The WPSK Women's League campaigned for residents to hide in the mountainous region controlled by guerillas the night before the election so they could not be brought out to vote at gunpoint, and thousands did. Many election officials even declined to show up. These campaigns, along with sporadic arson, violent demonstrations and attacks on three government installations on election day rendered the election useless. The turnout in Jeju was the lowest in all of South Korea, so low that the two seats reserved for Jeju province in the new national assembly were left vacant.

Fearing an  upsurge in guerrilla activities after they succeeded in getting what they wanted out of the election, General Dean requested a US Navy blockade of the island on May 11, so that sympathizers from the mainland could not reach Jeju.

August 1948 underground elections and Yeosu rebellion 
Although guerrilla activities waned during the summer months of 1948, they picked up again in August after the Soviet Union held elections north of the 38th parallel to form the Democratic People's Republic of Korea (DPRK). In conjunction with these elections, the Workers' Party of North Korea (WPNK) organized "underground elections" for those wanting to participate south of the 38th parallel, including on Jeju Island.  Although the turnout of these elections is disputed, they succeeded at emboldening WPSK military forces. In the months following the elections, conditions worsened to the point that Republic of Korea (ROK) officials decided to send the Fourteenth Regiment of the Korean Constabulary, stationed near the southern port city of Yeosu, to Jeju Island to assist counter-guerrilla efforts. Not wanting to "murder the people of Jeju," however, thousands of these troops mutinied on October 20, 1948, just as they were preparing to depart. They killed many of the high-ranking officers and former Japanese collaborators and seized Yeosu and surrounding areas before retreating into the areas around Jirisan mountain and setting up guerrilla bases, much as the Jeju guerrillas did while hiding out in Hallasan. Embarrassed by this incident, Syngman Rhee, the newly elected president of the ROK, intensified the government's efforts to stamp out the rebellion. On November 17, 1948, Syngman Rhee proclaimed martial law in order to quell the rebellion. During this period, ROK police forces engaged in numerous war crimes. One report describes the events of December 14, 1948 at a small Jeju village, in which ROK forces attacked the village and kidnapped many young men and girls. The girls were gang-raped over a two-week period and were then executed along with the young men.

By the end of 1948, the ROK's harsh tactics and effective suppression campaigns had reduced the number of guerrilla forces to just 300.

WPSK's 1949 New Year offensive and the ROK's eradication campaign 
On January 1, 1949, the guerrillas launched one last offensive against ROK police. They attacked at Odong-ni and Jeju City, but were beaten back by ROK police and driven to the island's interior mountains. ROK police pursued the guerrillas and continued to commit atrocities, including rounding up whole villages and killing them all. The ROK forces, now determined to destroy the remaining WPSK guerrillas, launched an eradication campaign in March 1949. During the campaign, 2,345 guerrillas and 1,668 civilians were killed. With the campaign now effectively over, the ROK held elections on Jeju Island to fill the province's empty seats in the National Assembly; Jeju Island was now effectively and symbolically under ROK jurisdiction.

United States involvement
At the beginning of the uprising, the island was controlled by the United States Army Military Government in Korea. Only a small number of Americans were present. Jimmie Leach, a captain in the US Army, was an adviser to the South Korean Constabulary and claimed that there were six Americans on the island, including himself, and that they could call on two small L-4 scout planes and two old minesweepers converted to coastal cutters, manned by Korean crews. On March 8, 1949, the US Armed Forces sent an investigation team headed by Colonel James A. Casteel to Jeju to investigate the causes of the rebellion. They summarized that the February 1948 Jeju general strike prior to the rebellion was caused by instigation by the WPSK and hostility towards the police as a result of shootings. They also described the strike as "communist inspired" but participated by both the left and right in response to the March 1 shootings.

By the spring of 1949 four South Korean Army battalions arrived and joined the local constabulary, police forces, and right-wing Northwest Youth Association partisans to brutally suppress protests. The combined forces quickly destroyed or disabled most of the remaining rebel forces. On August 17, 1949, the leadership of the movement fell apart following the killing of major rebel leader Yi Tuk-ku. The US military later called the complete destruction of Jungsangan village a "successful operation."

The National Committee for the Investigation of the Truth about the Jeju April 3 Incident concluded that the U.S. Army Military Government in Korea and the Korean Military Advisory Group shared responsibility for the incident as it began under the rule of the military government and an American colonel was in charge of the security forces of Jeju until August 1948.

After the outbreak of the Korean War, the US assumed command of the South Korean armed forces. Brigadier General William Lynn Roberts commanded Americans on Jeju.

The US military documented massacres but did not intervene. On May 13, 1949, the US ambassador to South Korea wired Washington that the Jeju rebels and their sympathizers had been, "killed, captured, or converted." Stars and Stripes reported on the South Korean Army's brutal suppression of the rebellion, local support for the rebels, as well as rebel retaliation against local rightist opponents.

Korean War

Immediately after the North Korean invasion of South Korea, the South Korean military ordered the "preemptive apprehension" of suspected leftists nationwide. Thousands were detained on Jeju and then sorted into four groups, labeled A, B, C and D, based on the perceived security risks each posed. On August 30, 1950, a written order by a senior intelligence officer in the South Korean Navy instructed Jeju's police to "execute all those in groups C and D by firing squad no later than September 6."

Aftermath
In one of its first official acts, the South Korean National Assembly passed the National Traitors Act in 1948, which among other measures, outlawed the Workers Party of South Korea. For almost fifty years after the uprising, it was a crime punishable by beatings, torture, and a lengthy prison sentence if any South Korean even mentioned the events of the Jeju uprising. The event had been largely ignored by the government. In 1992, President Roh Tae Woo's government sealed up a cave on Mount Halla, where the remains of massacre victims had been discovered. After civil rule was reinstated in the 1990s, the government admitted that the events on Jeju Island had taken place. A decade later in 2006, the government of South Korea issued an official apology.

In October 2003, President Roh Moo-hyun apologized to the populace of Jeju for the brutal suppression of the uprising: "Due to wrongful decisions of the government, many innocent people of Jeju suffered many casualties and destruction of their homes." Roh was the first South Korean president to apologize for the 1948 massacre. In March 2009, the Truth and Reconciliation Commission revealed, "At least 20,000 people jailed for taking part in the popular uprisings in Jeju, Yeosu and Suncheon, accused of being communists, were massacred in some 20 prisons across the country," when the Korean War broke out.

The commission reported 14,373 victims during the uprising, 86 percent at the hands of the security forces and 14 percent at the hands of armed rebels, and estimated that the total death toll was as high as 30,000. The commission listed the number of confirmed deaths at each stage of the incident; 104 deaths from March 3, 1947 to April 4, 1948; 214 deaths during the initial armed uprising from April 4 to May 10; and 637 deaths during armed conflict from May 11 to October 10. The most violent period was from October 11, 1948 to March 1, 1949, with 9,709 confirmed deaths. There were a further 2,668 confirmed deaths between March 3, 1949 and June 24, 1950. 800 more deaths occurred on Jeju up to 21 September, 1954. The commission confirmed 7,624 victims of the security forces, and 1,528 victims of the armed rebels. Further, they confirmed 448 victims of systematic civilian massacres.

Some 70 percent of the island's 230 villages were burned to the ground, and over 39,000 houses were destroyed. Of the 400 villages before the uprising only 170 remained afterwards. In 2008, bodies of massacre victims were discovered in a mass grave near Jeju International Airport. Estimates of the overall deaths of the 1948-1950 uprising run as high as 100,000.

In January 2019, the Jeju District Court overturned military court rulings that imprisoned Jeju Islanders, clearing the names of the 18 surviving plaintiffs and recognizing them as wronged victims of the Jeju April 3 Uprising and Massacre. At the 71st commemoration of Jeju uprising, April 3, 2019, the South Korean police and defense ministry apologized for the first time over the massacres.

Controversies

Effort of truth ascertainment
Families of victims of the uprising and associated massacres, as well as various civic organizations, continuously attempted to openly discuss the uprising but the national government suppressed all materials and discussions, and even made the topic of the uprising illegal. The first published recollection in South Korea of the massacre was the 1978 novel Sun-i Samch'on ("Uncle Suni") which is set during the event. However, it was swiftly banned by the ROK government and its author, Hyun Ki-young, was arrested and tortured for three days by the National Intelligence Service.

However, on November 23, 1998, after the democratization of South Korea, President Kim Dae-jung stated that "the Jeju uprising was a communist rebellion, but there are a lot of people who died under false accusations as innocents, so now we have to reveal the truth and clear their false charges." On December 26, 1999, the National Assembly passed a bill, 'A special law for the Jeju uprising truth ascertainment and the regaining impaired reputation of the victims'. On January 12, 2000, the National Assembly legislated a law so the Korean government could begin conducting an investigation of the uprising. Due to this decision, it could be possible to expand the human rights of the residents of Jeju. On October 15, 2003, a truth ascertainment committee of the Jeju uprising was assembled according to the special law, and ascertained a fact-finding report of the Jeju uprising. In line with the finding of the committee, on October 31, 2003, former president Roh Moo-hyeon admitted that the brutal suppression of the uprising was a massive abuse of governmental power and made a public apology to the people of Jeju on behalf of the Republic of Korea. On the 71st anniversary of the event, the defense ministry and police under the Moon Jae-in administration apologized for the past government's role in the Jeju massacre.

Causes

Some right-wing groups, including the Wallganjosun, and Jaehyanggooninhwe argued that the Jeju uprising was led and instigated by the WPSK.

Kim Gwang-dong, the director of researching policy in Korea argued that though the fundamental characteristic of the uprising was "subversion of the system," there were many skewed and biased studies that criticized the Korean government's faults in suppressing the rebellion. He said that "it was an armed struggle and revolt of the forces who advocate communism against forces who support liberal democracy."

A Presbyterian minister, Lee Jong-yoon, said at a church in Seoul that "the Jeju rising was incurred by the leftist forces and they provoked the rebellion to disturb the May 10 general election." The statement was broadcast through the CTS channel.

On November 20, 2010, a chairman of an adjustment committee of past affairs and a former new right, Lee Young-Jo argued that the "Jeju rising was apparent communist-led rebellion."

Legality of martial law
There are controversies about the legality of martial law, which took effect on November 17, 1948. One side believes it was illegal according to the first constitution of South Korea. The other side argues that martial law from the Japanese colonial era still existed and therefore permitted any violence effectuating martial law. This part continued before August 15, 1948, and after the formation of the South Korean government.

Post-processing and debating the case
Although the June, 2000 incident report stated that 14,028 victims were found, it is very likely that the number was higher since there are both unidentified or unidentifiable victims. In addition, about 180 soldiers died in combat, and 140 policemen died in the April 3 incident.

In 2003, South Korea's National Committee for the Investigation of the Truth concluded that the US Army military government and the Korean military shared responsibility for the incident. On October 31, 2003, South Korean president Roh Moo-hyun offered an apology to the victims of the Jeju incident. On March 28, 2008, the Korea Institute of Science and Technology opened a chemical aid project in Bonggae-dong, Jeju as part of a joint compensation program for the Jeju April 3 incident.

In January 2019, 18 survivors, who were formally charged with insurrection, were acquitted more than 70 years after their imprisonment. The Jeju District Court overturned military court rulings that imprisoned Jeju Islanders, clearing the names of the 18 surviving plaintiffs and recognizing them as wronged victims of the Jeju April 3 Uprising and Massacre. At the 71st commemoration of Jeju uprising, April 3, 2019, the South Korean police and defense ministry apologized for the first time over the massacres.

In popular media
 Jiseul is a 2012 South Korean film about Jeju residents during the uprising.
 Zainichi Korean writer Kim Sok-pom wrote a novel titled Kazantō (Volcanic Island) about the event; his work is seen as controversial in South Korea and he has been denied entry to the country twice (in 1980 and 2015).
This song contains the agony of the victims of Jeju uprising. In 2013, Soreyu choir from Tokyo, Japan sang this song. A choir member of the Soreyu, Saito Gathuki said, "Years ago, I recognized the 4.3 affair through the documentary of NHK. Because I am in a generation before war, I couldn't know about the war and Korea. But now, I get to know the tragedy of war and massacre since I visit [Jeju]."
The Island of Sea Women by Lisa See is set on Jeju Island, beginning during a period of Japanese colonialism in the 1930s, followed by World War II, the Korean War, and its aftermath, including great detail of the Jeju uprising.

See also
 History of South Korea
 List of massacres in South Korea
 Bodo League massacre
 Dark tourism
 February 28 incident in Taiwan

Notes

References

Further reading
 Kim, Seong-nae. "The Work of Memory: Ritual Laments of the Dead and Korea's Cheju Massacre." A Companion to the Anthropology of Religion (2013): 223–238. 

1948 in South Korea
1948 protests
1949 protests
20th-century rebellions
History of Jeju Province
Mass murder in 1948
History of South Korea
Massacres in South Korea
Zainichi Korean history
Anti-communist terrorism
North Korean refugees
Korean War
Political repression in South Korea
Wartime sexual violence
Massacres committed by South Korea
War crimes in South Korea
South Korean war crimes
Military scandals
Rebellions in Asia
Allied occupation of Korea
Cold War rebellions
Political and cultural purges
First Republic of Korea
Anti-Americanism
Conflicts in 1948
Conflicts in 1949
Conflicts in 1950
Conflicts in 1951
Conflicts in 1952
Conflicts in 1953
Communism-based civil wars